Mary A. McLaughlin (born 1946) is an inactive Senior United States district judge of the United States District Court for the Eastern District of Pennsylvania.

Education and career

Born in Philadelphia, Pennsylvania, McLaughlin received a Bachelor of Arts degree from Gwynedd-Mercy College in 1968, a Master of Arts from Bryn Mawr College in 1969, and a Juris Doctor from the University of Pennsylvania Law School in 1976. She was a law clerk for Judge Stanley Seymour Brotman 1976 to 1977, and went on to work in private practice from 1977 to 1980. She was an Assistant United States Attorney of the United States Attorney's office for the District of Columbia from 1980 to 1984. She was an assistant professor at the Vanderbilt University School of Law from 1984 to 1986.

After leaving Vanderbilt, McLaughlin returned to private practice for fourteen years, during which time she served as a partner at the law firm of Dechert LLP. She also completed stints as an adjunct professor at both the University of Pennsylvania and Rutgers University law schools. In 1995, McLaughlin was appointed chief counsel to the Senate Subcommittee on Terrorism, Technology and Government (a subcommittee of the Judiciary Committee).

Federal judicial service

McLaughlin was nominated by President Bill Clinton on March 9, 2000, for a seat on the United States District Court for the Eastern District of Pennsylvania. She was confirmed by the Senate on May 24, 2000, and received her commission on May 31, 2000. She simultaneously served a 2008 to 2015 term on the FISA Court. She took senior status on November 18, 2013.

References

Sources

1946 births
Living people
Assistant United States Attorneys
Bryn Mawr College alumni
Gwynedd Mercy University alumni
Judges of the United States District Court for the Eastern District of Pennsylvania
Lawyers from Philadelphia
United States district court judges appointed by Bill Clinton
University of Pennsylvania Law School alumni
Judges of the United States Foreign Intelligence Surveillance Court
20th-century American judges
21st-century American judges
20th-century American women judges
21st-century American women judges